The 25th Annual Screen Actors Guild Awards, honoring the best achievements in film and television performances for the year 2018, were presented on January 27, 2019 at the Shrine Auditorium in Los Angeles, California. The ceremony was broadcast live on both TNT and TBS 8:00 p.m. EST / 5:00 p.m. PST. The nominees were announced December 12, 2018 alongside the announcement of Megan Mullally as the ceremony's host.

Alan Alda was announced as the 2018 SAG Life Achievement Award recipient on October 4, 2018.

Winners and nominees
Note: Winners are listed first and highlighted in boldface.

Film

Television

Screen Actors Guild Life Achievement Award
 Alan Alda

In Memoriam
The segment honored the following who died in 2018:

 James Karen
 Bradford Dillman
 Charlotte Rae
 Dorothy Malone
 John Mahoney
 Olivia Cole
 Susan Anspach
 R. Lee Ermey
 Reg E. Cathey
 Philip Bosco
 Bill Daily
 David Ogden Stiers
 Chuck McCann
 Donald Moffat
 Jerry Maren
 Ricky Jay
 Aretha Franklin
 Ken Berry
 Barbara Harris
 John Gavin
 Nanette Fabray
 Soon-Tek Oh
 Tab Hunter
 Scott Wilson
 Kitty O'Neil
 Verne Troyer
 Mickey Jones
 Bob Einstein
 Sondra Locke
 Harry Anderson
 Margot Kidder
 Carol Channing
 Burt Reynolds
 Penny Marshall

Presenters
The following individuals presented awards at the ceremony:

Alec Baldwin and Megan Mullally with Outstanding Performance by a Male Actor in a Comedy Series
Matt Bomer and Ricky Martin with Outstanding Performance by a Female Actor in a Comedy Series
Bradley Cooper, Lady Gaga, Sam Elliott, and Anthony Ramos introduced A Star Is Born
Tracy Morgan with Outstanding Performance by an Ensemble in a Comedy Series
Chris Pine with Outstanding Performance by a Female Actor in a Supporting Role
Chadwick Boseman and Angela Bassett introduced Black Panther
Robin Wright with Outstanding Performance by a Male Actor in a Supporting Role
Keri Russell and Richard Madden with Outstanding Performance by a Male Actor in a Television Movie or Miniseries
John David Washington and Adam Driver introduced BlacKkKlansman
Glenn Close and Michael Douglas with Outstanding Performance by a Female Actor in a Television Movie or Miniseries
Constance Wu, Michelle Yeoh, Henry Golding, and Ken Jeong introduced Crazy Rich Asians
Tom Hanks presented the SAG Life Achievement Award
Awkwafina and Laverne Cox with Outstanding Performance by a Male Actor in a Drama Series
Rami Malek, Joe Mazzello, Gwilym Lee, and Ben Hardy introduced Bohemian Rhapsody
Antonio Banderas with Outstanding Performance by a Female Actor in a Drama Series
Scott Bakula presented In Memoriam segment
Hugh Grant with Outstanding Performance by an Ensemble in a Drama Series
Rachel Weisz with Outstanding Performance by a Male Actor in a Leading Role
Gary Oldman with Outstanding Performance by a Female Actor in a Leading Role
Jodie Foster with Outstanding Performance by a Cast in a Motion Picture

See also
 23rd Satellite Awards
 24th Critics' Choice Awards
 34th Independent Spirit Awards
 39th Golden Raspberry Awards
 45th Saturn Awards
 46th Annie Awards
 72nd British Academy Film Awards
 76th Golden Globe Awards
 91st Academy Awards

References

External links
 

2018
Screen Actors Guild Awards
Screen Actors Guild Awards
Screen Actors Guild Awards
Screen Actors Guild Awards
Screen Actors Guild Awards
Screen Actors Guild Awards
Screen Actors Guild Awards